The Rosengart Collection Museum (Museum Sammlung Rosengart) is an art museum located in Lucerne, Switzerland. It houses a collection of modern art based on two main artists: Paul Klee and Pablo Picasso.

Collection 
The art dealer Siegfried Rosengart (1894-1985), who worked in Munich with his uncle  Heinrich Thannhauser before moving to Lucerne, had contacts with Picasso and Marc Chagall. With his daughter, Angela, he built a modern art collection containing works by Vassily Kandinsky, Georges Braque, Chaïm Soutine, Amedeo Modigliani, Fernand Léger, Georges Seurat, Pierre Bonnard, Édouard Vuillard, Paul Cézanne ou Claude Monet, as well as Camille Pissarro, Auguste Renoir, Maurice Utrillo, Georges Rouault, Henri Matisse ou encore Joan Miró.

His Klee collection is the largest in private hands after that of the artist's family. Some of his Picassos were exhibited at the musée Picasso de Lucerne opened in 1978 by the Rosengarts, to celebrate the 800th anniversairy of the city.

His only daughter, Angela, founded the Fondation Rosengart in 1992. The Rosengart Collection opened in March 2002 and received more than 100,000 visitors in the following twelve months.

Building 
The former neoclassical building of the Swiss National Bank, built in 1923-1924 by the Zurich architect Hermann Herter, is purchased and its conversion entrusted to the architect Roger Diener. The art museum opened on March 26, 2002.

The ground floor shows works by Picasso, the basement those by Klee, and the first floor other artists. The former bank's conference room is preserved in its original state and open to visitors.

References 

 .

External links 

  (en+de)

Cultural property of national significance in the canton of Lucerne
Modern art museums
Art museums and galleries in Switzerland
Museums in Lucerne